Colin Dowdeswell and Zoltan Kuharszky were the defending champions, but Kuharszky did not participate this year.  Dowdeswell partnered Jakob Hlasek, losing in the final.

Peter Doohan and Brian Levine won the title, defeating Colin Dowdeswell and Jakob Hlasek 6–3, 6–4 in the final.

Seeds

Draw

Draw

External links
Draw

Tel Aviv Open
1984 Grand Prix (tennis)